Mark Simmons may refer to:
 Mark Simmons (American football) (born 1984), American football wide receiver 
 Mark Simmons (comedian) (born 1969 or 1970, British comedian 
 Mark Simmons (cricketer) (born 1955), former English cricketer
 Mark Simmons (boxer) (born 1974), Canadian heavyweight boxer
 Mark Simmons (police officer), British senior police officer
 Mark Simmons (politician), former Oregon house of representatives member

See also
 Marc Simmons, American historian
 Marcus Simmons (disambiguation)